De Korenbloem is a 19th-century smock mill in the village of Vriescheloo in the Netherlands.

Location 
De Korenbloem is located at the Wedderweg in the village of Vriescheloo in the east of the province of Groningen in the northeast of the Netherlands.

History 
De Korenbloem was built as a grist mill in 1895. An electric motor was installed in 1947. It has been a national heritage site since 1972. The windmill was restored in 1973.

References

External links 

 

1895 establishments in the Netherlands
Grinding mills in the Netherlands
Rijksmonuments in Groningen (province)
Smock mills in the Netherlands
Westerwolde (municipality)
Windmills completed in 1895
Windmills in Groningen (province)
19th-century architecture in the Netherlands